The Amelia Earhart Memorial Bridge is a network tied arch bridge over the Missouri River on U.S. Route 59 between Atchison, Kansas and Buchanan County, Missouri.  It opened in December 2012,  replacing a previous truss bridge with the same name.

The bridge is decorated with LED lighting which can be programmed to change for various functions.  Pictures of the bridge with its arch lights in red, white, blue giving the illusion of a fluttering American flag when reflected in the Missouri River is widely circulated in social media.

History
Plans for replacement of the old bridge with a new four-lane span with 10 foot shoulders were announced in the fall of 2007 by KDOT and MoDOT with construction slated on a new bridge for 2009–2011.  The bridge was designed by HNTB.

Because of the Missouri River flood during the summer and fall of 2011, construction was stopped.  Work on the bridge was started again toward the end of 2011.  The bridge's arch was built on-site, rather than barged in like some tied-arch bridges, and completed on June 14, 2012.  The new bridge was opened to traffic in December 2012.

Previous bridge
The previous, 2-lane, cantilever bridge was built in 1937–1938 by the Works Progress Administration.  It was designed by Sverdrup & Parcel. The bridge was originally named the Mo-Kan Free Bridge because it did not charge a toll (the adjacent railroad bridge served as a crossing for rail traffic as well as cars and pedestrians prior to the construction of the free bridge). The bridge was renamed for aviator Amelia Earhart, a native of Atchison, in 1997 to honor the centennial of her birth in Atchison. The illumination along the trusses and xenon spotlights that shine straight up into the sky from the top of the bridge's two peaks were installed and debuted during the Amelia Earhart Centennial Celebration on July 24, 1997.

The bridge was the topic of a preservation debate on whether to replace it with a new four-lane bridge or to keep it and build a second bridge.  The old bridge was demolished on October 9, 2013 using linear shaped charges.

See also
 
 
 
 
 List of crossings of the Missouri River

References

External links
Atchison Daily Globe profile
Historic Bridge Foundation article
MoDOT Amelia Earhart Memorial Bridge
KDOT Amelia Earhart Bridge Construction Progress Featured Online Webcam
EarthCam Amelia Earhart Bridge Project Webcam
Article and video of the demolition, with a view of the new bridge

Bridges completed in 1939
Bridges completed in 2012
Buildings and structures in Atchison County, Kansas
Buildings and structures in Buchanan County, Missouri
Bridges over the Missouri River
U.S. Route 59
Works Progress Administration in Missouri
Works Progress Administration in Kansas
Road bridges in Missouri
Road bridges in Kansas
Bridges of the United States Numbered Highway System
Monuments and memorials to Amelia Earhart
Steel bridges in the United States
Tied arch bridges in the United States
Truss bridges in the United States
Interstate vehicle bridges in the United States